Leptaulopus is a genus of flagfins native to the western Pacific Ocean,
with these currently recognized species:

 Leptaulopus damasi (S. Tanaka (I), 1915)
 Leptaulopus erythrozonatus M. F. Gomon, Struthers & A. L. Stewart, 2013

References

Aulopiformes